Gymnusini is a tribe of rove beetles in the subfamily Aleocharinae. It is a basal aleocharine group, and they inhabit riparian habitats. It was described in 1839.

The tribe is relatively small, with no subtribes and only two genera, one of which is monotypic: Gymnusa and Stylogymnusa.

References

Polyphaga tribes
Aleocharinae